The Quebrada de Humahuaca is a narrow mountain valley located in the province of Jujuy in northwest Argentina,  north of Buenos Aires.

The name quebrada (literally "broken") translates as a deep valley or ravine. It receives its name from Humahuaca, a small city of 11,000 inhabitants. The Grande River (Río Grande), which is dry in winter, flows copiously through the Quebrada in the summer.

The region has always been a crossroads for economic, social and cultural communication. It has been populated for at least 10,000 years, since the settlement of the first hunter-gatherers, which is evidenced by substantial prehistoric remains. In particular, many stone-walled agricultural terraces, thought to originate more than 1500 years ago, are found throughout the region and are still in use today. The field system links a series of fortified towns called pucaras. The valley was later a caravan road for the Inca Empire in the 15th century, then an important link between the Viceroyalty of the Río de la Plata and the Viceroyalty of Peru, as well as a stage for many battles of the Spanish War of Independence.

The Quebrada de Humahuaca was designated a protected landscape in 2000. It was made a UNESCO World Heritage Site on 2 July 2003.

See also
 Iruya
 Abra Pampa
 Hornillos de Eresma
 Huacalera
 Humahuaca
 La Quiaca
 Maimará
 Purmamarca
 Cerro de los Siete Colores
 Pucará de Tilcara
 Tilcara
 Volcán
 Serranía de Hornocal

References

External links
 UNESCO World Heritage Centre - Description of the site.
 Jujuy Province - Official website (in Spanish).
 
 Pictures from Humahuaca

Landforms of Jujuy Province
World Heritage Sites in Argentina
Tourist attractions in Jujuy Province
Valleys of Argentina
Southern Andean Yungas